The , commonly known in Japanese as , is a national confederation of Japanese labor unions. There was another  from 1947-1950.

Founding and history
In the late 1980s there were many changes in the trade union movement in Japan. The two major bodies of trade unions, the General Council of Trade Unions of Japan (Sōhyō) and the Japanese Confederation of Labor (Dōmei), formed the National Confederation of Trade Unions (Rengo) in 1989, advocating the importance of the Japanese Labor Union movement being unified. On the other hand, a number of other labor unions which felt Rengo was too conservative, formed the National Confederation of Trade Unions (Zenroren), which had a close relationship with the Japanese Communist Party.

There were some other labor unions which did not wish to join either Rengo or Zenroren, who formed the National Trade Union Council on December 9, 1989 with its slogan of being a "Real fighting labor union movement". This organization was born out of the Labor Research Center, which had been created by former Sōhyō chairmen Kaoru Ota and Makoto Ichikawa and former secretary general Akira Iwai.

Unlike organizations such as Sōhyō or Zenroren, Zenrokyo regards itself as a council of its affiliated labor unions, rather than a national center of labor unions. Despite this, given that it has national coverage with its affiliated member organizations being widely spread throughout the nation, it is often regarded as one of the national centers of labor unions in Japan.

Currently

Zenrokyo holds a regular annual conference. Its most recent, the 23rd annual conference, was held in September 2011.

Estimates of Zenrokyo's membership vary. Zenrokyo itself declares its membership to be some 300,000, while according to the investigation by the Ministry of Health, Labor, and Welfare its numbers were reported as 118,000 as of December, 2010.

In terms of its membership, Zenrokyo is much smaller than Rengo and Zenroren. However, it is also the only one of the major trade union federations to actively organize foreign workers in Japan.

Its membership rose to 128,000 as of the end of June 2011.

Politically, Zenrokyo has had a close relation with the left group of the Social Democratic Party, and it supports both the Social Democratic Party and the New Socialist Party. However, Zenrokyo does not force its members to raise funds as an organization or to support the political parties mentioned above, and it regrets that this was done in the Sōhyō period.

Zenrokyo's priorities
 Safeguarding the Peace Constitution
 Opposition to war
 Opposition to US Military Facilities in Japan
 Support for the Peace movement
 Opposition to dismissals and restructuring, as shown in Zenrokyo's support for the JNR dismissal lawsuit.

In addition to this, Zenrokyo cooperates with Zenroren and Rengo on some issues.

Affiliated unions

There are also other labor unions.
Local organizations in 10 prefectures and 1 region of Japan.

See also

 Labor unions in Japan
 National Union of General Workers
 General Union
 University Teachers Union

References

External links
  

National trade union centers of Japan
Trade unions established in 1989